Mikhaylovka is a rural locality (a village) in Timiryazevskoye Rural Settlement, Novousmansky District, Voronezh Oblast, Russia. The population was 688 as of 2010. There are 16 streets.

Geography 
Mikhaylovka is located 31 km southeast of Novaya Usman (the district's administrative centre) by road. Sadovy is the nearest rural locality.

References 

Rural localities in Novousmansky District